Justus Engelhardt Kühn (unknown-c1717) was a portrait painter active in colonial Maryland in the early part of the eighteenth century. He was the earliest professional artist to work in the Middle Atlantic colonies. A number of his portraits are held in the collection of the Maryland Historical Society.

Early life
Kuhn was a Protestant, of German origin. Little is known of his early life.

Career
Kuhn was active in the early 1700s and painted a number of local dignitaries in Maryland including Henry Darnall III, Charles Carroll of Annapolis and Eleanor Darnall Carroll.

Kuhn applied for naturalization at Annapolis in 1708. He became the churchwarden at St. Ann's church at Annapolis in 1717. He died six months later.

Gallery

Notes

References
 Roarke, Elizabeth, Artists of Colonial America. Retrieved 16 August 2018

External links
Kuhn and MDHS.org Retrieved 16 August 2018

18th-century American painters
18th-century American male artists
American male painters
American people of German descent
Painters from Maryland
German emigrants to the Thirteen Colonies
Year of birth unknown
1717 deaths